Reserve is a census-designated place (CDP) in the Town of Couderay, Sawyer County, Wisconsin, United States. The population was 429 at the 2010 census.

Geography
Reserve is located at  (45.859877, -91.372722).

According to the United States Census Bureau, the CDP has a total area of 53.7 square miles (139.1 km2), of which, 53.0 square miles (137.3 km2) of it is land and 0.7 square miles (1.8 km2) of it (1.30%) is water.

Demographics
As of the census of 2000, there were 436 people, 160 households, and 103 families residing in the CDP. The population density was 8.2 people per square mile (3.2/km2). There were 252 housing units at an average density of 4.8/sq mi (1.8/km2). The racial makeup of the CDP was 17.66% White, 82.11% Native American, and 0.23% from two or more races.

There were 160 households, out of which 31.9% had children under the age of 18 living with them, 34.4% were married couples living together, 18.8% had a female householder with no husband present, and 35.6% were non-families. 33.1% of all households were made up of individuals, and 12.5% had someone living alone who was 65 years of age or older. The average household size was 2.73 and the average family size was 3.42.

In the CDP, the population was spread out, with 33.3% under the age of 18, 11.2% from 18 to 24, 25.2% from 25 to 44, 20.0% from 45 to 64, and 10.3% who were 65 years of age or older. The median age was 30 years. For every 100 females, there were 100.9 males. For every 100 females age 18 and over, there were 92.7 males.

The median income for a household in the CDP was $22,250, and the median income for a family was $32,750. Males had a median income of $23,125 versus $21,094 for females. The per capita income for the CDP was $10,588. About 22.7% of families and 26.2% of the population were below the poverty line, including 11.8% of those under age 18 and 21.7% of those age 65 or over.

References

Census-designated places in Sawyer County, Wisconsin
Census-designated places in Wisconsin